Regierungsbezirk Gumbinnen was a Regierungsbezirk, or government region, of the Prussian province of East Prussia from 1808 until 1945. The regional capital was Gumbinnen (Gusev).

History
In 1808 during the Napoleonic Wars, East Prussia was divided into the Regierungsbezirke of Gumbinnen, comprising the eastern parts of the former Duchy of Prussia, and Königsberg.  On November 1, 1905, the southern districts of the two regions were separated to create Regierungsbezirk Allenstein. The districts of Johannisburg, Lötzen, Lyck and Sensburg were transferred from Regierungsbezirk Gumbinnen to Regierungsbezirk Allenstein.

Regierungsbezirk Gumbinnen was dissolved in 1945 when East Prussia was partitioned between Poland and the Soviet Union after World War II according to the resolutions at the Potsdam Conference.

Districts in 1937
As of December 31, 1937

Urban districts
Insterburg
Tilsit

Rural districts
Angerburg (Węgorzewo today, Węgobork between 1945–1946)
Darkehmen (Ozyorsk today)
Goldap (Gołdap today)
 (Gusevsky District today)
Insterburg (Chernyakhovsk today)
Niederung (seat: Heinrichswalde) (Slavsk today)
Pillkallen (Dobrovolsk today, Schlossberg between 1938–1945)
Stallupönen (Nesterov today, Ebenrode between 1938–1945)
Tilsit-Ragnit (Sovetsk-Neman today) (seat: Tilsit)
Treuburg (Name of district was Oletzko before 1933) (Seat: Marggrabowa or Oletzko between 1560-1928 and renamed as Treuburg in 1928, Olecko today)

Districts in 1945
As of January 1, 1945:

Urban districts
Memel
Insterburg
Tilsit

Rural districts
Darkehmen
Angerburg
Ebenrode
Elchniederung (seat: Heinrichswalde)
Goldap
Gumbinnen
Heydekrug (Šilutė today)
Insterburg
Memel (Klaipėda today)
Schloßberg (Ostpr.)
Sudauen (Suwałki today)
Tilsit-Ragnit (seat: Tilsit)
Treuburg

States and territories disestablished in 1945
East Prussia
Government regions of Prussia
States and territories established in 1808
1815 establishments in Prussia